The British International School, Cairo (BISC) is a private British school in Beverly Hills, a compound within the 6th of October City, in Greater Cairo, Egypt.

BISC was previously in Zamalek. It moved from its Zamalek location in September 2008 to its new purpose-built campus in the residential compound of Beverly Hills. BISC has an extensive campus with facilities including a theatre, Olympic swimming pool and age-appropriate learning spaces for all students.

BISC is an independent, fee-financed, not for profit school authorised by the Ministry of Education. The Good Schools Guide International states that the school "offers a world-class education – the best in Egypt – and prestige.  To be a BISC graduate certainly says something." The school is regularly inspected by BSO and is one of only a handful of schools certified by COBIS within Egypt.

References

External links

School website

International schools in Greater Cairo
Schools in 6th of October (city)
British international schools in Egypt
International Baccalaureate schools in Egypt
Private schools in Egypt
Educational institutions established in 1976
1976 establishments in Egypt